The Marseille Metro is a rapid transit system serving Marseille, in Southern France. Line 1 opened in 1977, followed by Line 2 in 1984. Two stations, Saint-Charles and Castellane, each provide interchange between lines.

The system's MPM 76 trains use the rubber-tyred metro technology developed by the RATP for some lines of the Paris Métro. In 2012, the Marseille Metro carried approximately 76.7 million passengers, making it a core part of the transport network in the Marseille urban area, with 49% of journeys using the metro. Since 1986, the Régie des transports métropolitains (Régie des transports de Marseille until 2016) has operated the network, operating it since it changed its name on behalf of the Aix-Marseille-Provence Metropolis.

Timeline 
{| class="wikitable"
! width="15%" | Date
! width="10%" | Line
! width="75%" | Event
|-
| 26 November 1977 || align=center rowspan=2 | Line 1|| First section opened between La Rose and Saint-Charles
|-
| 11 March 1978 || Extended southwards from Saint-Charles to Castellane
|-
| 3 March 1984 || align=center rowspan=3 | Line 2 || Section opened between Joliette and Castellane
|-
| 1 February 1986 || Extended southwards from Castellane to Sainte-Marguerite Dromel
|-
| 14 February 1987 || Extended northwards from Joliette to Bougainville
|-
| 5 September 1992 || align=center rowspan=2 | Line 1|| Extended eastwards from Castellane to La Timone
|-
| 5 May 2010 || Extended eastwards from La Timone to La Fourragère
|-
| 16 December 2019 || align=center rowspan=2 | Line 2 || Extended northwards from Bougainville to Gèze
|-
| After 2030 || align=center | Line 3
|}

 History 

The first plans for a metro system in Marseille appeared in the early years of the 20th century, following the opening of the Paris metro. Many plans were put forward, but quickly abandoned due to lack of financing. The most serious proposal emanated in 1918 from the Compagnie d'électricité de Marseille, which proposed to build an underground network similar to the Paris métro. This proposal was met with fierce opposition from the Compagnie générale française de tramways, which owned and operated the city's tramway system. This project ultimately failed, and the idea of building a metro in Marseille was abandoned for many decades.

Several proposals came immediately before and after the Second World War calling for modernizing the existing tramways with a network of lines running underground, but all were scrapped due to material shortages. Instead, the system, so badly damaged by the conflict, was almost completely dismantled during the following decade and replaced by buses (with the exception of line 68). However, by 1960, the city was suffering from severe congestion due to the growth in automobile use. A number of alternative concepts came forward at the time, including light rail or commuter train networks, but found no support among municipal authorities. It was not until 1964, when a project calling for a construction of an underground metro line to replace the busiest bus routes, that interest was aroused among elected officials. After several years of studies, the city council voted unanimously in 1969 for the creation of a metro system.

Construction of the first line started on August 13, 1973 and lasted until early 1977. Revenue operation started on November 26, 1977 on a portion of the line, between La Rose and Saint-Charles. The rest of the line opened on March 11, 1978. The plans for the second line were approved in 1978. Construction began in 1980. The central portion of the line, between Joliette and Castellane, opened on March 3, 1984. Southern and northern portions of the line were opened in February 1986 and February 1987 respectively.

Subsequent extensions took place in the following years. Line 1 was first extended between Castellane and La Timone on September 5, 1992 (2 new stations), and then between La Timone and La Fourragère (4 new stations) in 2010. On 16 December 2019, line 2 was extended northwards from Bougainville to Gèze (1 new station).

 Current network 
 Map 

 Rolling stock 
The rolling stock comprises 36 4-car trains, named MPM 76. Trains have a capacity of 472 passengers (including 182 seats). MPM 76 trains use the rubber tyre metro technology developed by the RATP for the Paris métro.

Trains were built in Valenciennes, France, by a group of French companies which are now part of Alstom group. A first batch of 21 3-car trains was delivered in 1976, for line 1. A second batch of 15 was delivered in 1983, for line 2. In 1985, a fourth car was added on every train, in order to increase capacity.

 Commercial operation 

The metro system is operated by the Régie des Transports Métropolitains, on behalf of the Urban Community of Marseille Provence Métropole, which owns the infrastructure as well as the rolling stock.

Service is open every day, from 5 am to 1 am the next day. Trains run every 3 minutes during rush hour, and every 10 minutes during evenings.

The metro system transported 76.7 million passengers in 2012, leading to an average daily ridership of over 210,000.

 Planned developments 
The new Capitaine Gèze'' station will feature a bus station and a park and ride facility. This short extension will reuse existing service tracks that currently lead to the Zoccola depot. The cost is estimated to be 80 million euros.

A 5 km extension of line 2 to La Pomme railway station is planned for 2030. This extension will include 6 new stations.

Several other long-term extensions, including a northern extension of line 2 and a third line, are being considered.

In 2012, it was projected that the MPM76 rolling stock would be replaced starting in 2020.

The new rolling stock built by Alstom will be gradually rolled out at the end of 2024 and will be operated first with a driver and then fully automatic when all the old trains are replaced. The new rolling stock will have open gangways and will have a frequency of 90 seconds. The stations will all be equipped with platform screen doors and retrofitted with accessibility.

See also 
 List of Marseille Metro stations
 Marseille tramway
 List of metro systems

References

Bibliography

External links

 Marseille Metro Map on Google earth with geolocation
 RTM – official website 
 Marseille at UrbanRail.net 

 
Rapid transit in France
Rail transport in Marseille
Rubber-tyred metros